The Arkansas Activities Association (AAA) is the primary sanctioning body for high school sports in state of Arkansas.  AAA is a member association of the National Federation of State High School Associations (NFSHSA).  Every public secondary school in Arkansas is a de jure member of the AAA, and most private schools, save for a few schools in the delta that belong to the Mississippi Private Schools Association and 22 Christian schools who belong to the Heartland Christian Athletic Association , are included in membership.

The Arkansas Activities Association, or "AAA," was founded in 1904 by seven high schools and colleges and was called the "Arkansas State Athletic Association."   In 1912, the high schools separated from the colleges and became the "Arkansas Athletics Association."  Membership increased rapidly, and eventually the name of the organization was changed to the "Arkansas Activities Association".

The following member organizations exist within AAA:

 Athletic Directors: Arkansas High School Athletic Administrators Association (AHSAAA)
 Coaches: Arkansas High School Coaches Association (AHSCA)
 Officials: Arkansas Officials Association (AOA)

History
Prior to integration of public schools, the AAA only governed the activities of white schools. Until 1961, the association required special permission before an integrated school could compete with an all-white school, even in band. The first AAA-sanctioned meeting between a predominantly white school and a black school occurred October 28, 1966 between Little Rock Central High School and Little Horace Mann. Some integrated schools were admitted to the AAA by 1966, and all of the African-American schools were admitted to the AAA in 1967, but maintained separate districts. This resulted in a situation in which all-black Stuttgart Holman was to play partially integrated Pine Bluff Southeast, which had been admitted to the AAA in 1966, for the African-American championship. The AAA refused to allow the title game to take place, on the grounds that Holman was not a member of the association. In 1968 the districts were realigned to include black and white schools in the same districts.

Sanctioned sports
The AAA currently governs a total of 12 sports:

Fall
Bowling (Boys/Girls)
Cheer / Dance (Girls/Co-Ed)
Cross Country (Boys/Girls)
Football
Golf (Boys/Girls)
Volleyball (Girls)

Winter
Basketball (Boys/Girls)
Swimming and diving (Boys/Girls)
Wrestling (Boys/Girls)

Spring
Baseball (Boys)
Soccer (Boys/Girls)
Softball (Girls)
Tennis (Boys/Girls)
Track and field (Boys/Girls)

Other activities
Although the word "activities" is used in the name, the AAA is directly responsible only for interscholastic athletics. Other activities, including music, forensics, and spirit groups, are governed by their own associations affiliated with yet not part of the AAA, who is only responsible for sanctioning the events. These associations usually adopt the AAA's means of determining eligibility as well as its size classifications seen below, but regional classifications and means of organizing events are left only to their respective associations.

The AAA maintains affiliations with several non-sporting activities associations. These associations generally use AAA guidelines regarding a student's eligibility to participate.
Arkansas Communication and Theatre Arts Association (ACTAA) — a professional non-profit organization that serves the students and teachers of Oral Communication, Debate, Forensic Activities, Theatre, and Dance in Arkansas. ACTAA is affiliated with the Arkansas District of the National Forensics League.
Arkansas Association of Student Councils (AASC) — an organization that support student government and Student Council activities; affiliated with National Association of Student Councils (NASC).
Arkansas Junior Science & Humanities Symposium (AR JSHS) — annual event that is designed to challenge and engage students (Grades 9-12) in science, technology, engineering or mathematics (STEM). Individual students compete for scholarships and recognition by presenting the results of their original research efforts before a panel of judges and an audience of their peers.
Arkansas School Band and Orchestra Association (ASBOA) — supports students and educators with competitions in a variety of marching band, jazz band, and orchestra.
Arkansas Scholastic Press Association (ASPA) & Arkansas Journalism Advisors Association (AJAA) — provides students and educators with resources, competitions and programs focused on yearbook, newspaper, photography and digital media.
Arkansas FFA — chartered in 1928 and serves as state organization within the National FFA Organization.

Organization

The AAA organizes its member schools by 3-year average daily membership (ADM) in grades 10-12 every two years.  Each classification is organized by rank, as opposed to a minimum threshold, to maintain consistent numbers for each class.

Classifications
Since 2006, the schools have been organized as follows.

Class 7A (16 largest schools)
Class 6A (next 16 largest schools)
Class 5A (next 32 largest schools)
Class 4A (next 48 largest schools that sponsor football ("football schools"), as well as all non-football schools within range)
Class 3A (same means as Class 4A)
Class 2A (next 48 largest schools and remainder of football schools)
Class 1A (all remaining schools)

The means of placing private schools within these classifications have become a key issue in Arkansas.  Prior to 2002, only single-gender schools would have its enrollment altered, in this case by doubling the reported enrollment.  In 2002, the enrollments reported by private schools was multiplied by 1.35.  In 2006, that multiplier was increased to 1.75.  Starting in 2008, the multiplier will be dropped altogether, and each private school will be placed one classification above where the enrollment would otherwise place the school. In 2012, enrollment for private schools that were segregated were combined (for example, Catholic High School for Boys with Mount Saint Mary Academy (for Girls)).

Within each classification, the schools are further grouped into conferences, each with 6-8 schools apiece.  In Classes 7A-5A, the conferences are named according to directional region (i.e. 7A-West, 6A-Central, 5A-Southeast).  In the smaller classes, the conferences are named according to the activity district number which the conference is centrally located (a class 4A conference in western Arkansas would be the 4A-4 conference).  In smaller classes, there can be more than one conference within an activity district.  These are further named according to directional area (a pair of class 2A conferences in southwest Arkansas would be the 2A-7 West and 2A-7 East).  Classes 3A and 2A group conferences for football and basketball separately (Mountainburg is in Conference 3A-1 for football and 3A-4 for basketball).  Finally, sports with limited sponsorship, such as soccer and swimming, have their own conferences between the participants.  These special conferences often transcend multiple classes.

From 2010 to 2016, the rules for 7A and 6A classification for football were changed. The divisions still compete in separate playoffs, but two regional conferences that have previously been exclusive to 7A or 6A now have a mix of 7A and 6A schools so as to save on transportation expenses during the regular season.

Conferences

For purposes of clarity, the activity districts with regions covered are as follows.

District 1 (northwest Arkansas)
District 2 (north central Arkansas)
District 3 (northeast Arkansas)
District 4 (west Arkansas)
District 5 (central Arkansas)
District 6 (east Arkansas)
District 7 (southwest Arkansas)
District 8 (southeast Arkansas)

The AAA has changed both the names and means of these classifications over time.  
Prior to 1977, the classes ranged from Class AAAA to Class C, with AAAA including the 8 largest schools in Arkansas.  In 1977, the first "class shift" added an "A" to each class, and references to Class C were removed.
In 1983, Class AAAAA merged into and was renamed Class AAAA, with all other classes relatively consistent.
In 1998, the state witnessed the second "class shift", this time removing all references to Class B.
In 2006, Class AAAAA was split in half, and Classes AAA and AA, both with over 70 schools each, were reorganized into three smaller classes. At first, the largest class was called Class AAAAAAA.  The current naming conventions, changing the reference to 7A, were adopted soon after.

Prior to 2006, the activity district number was placed in front of the class for conference names (i.e. 4AAA, 7AA-East).  These naming conventions changed as well, but many local media outlets still placed the district number before the class (3-4A instead of 4A-3).  Prior to this, a few outlets mixed prior references to new ones (some newspapers in western Arkansas made references to the 4AAA-West, yet such a conference never existed).

Class 7A
The following conferences exist within the 7A classification for the 2016–18 school years:

Central
Bryant Hornets
Cabot Panthers
Catholic Rockets / Mt. St. Mary's Belles
Little Rock Central Tigers
Conway Wampus Cats
North Little Rock Charging Wildcats
Fort Smith Northside Grizzlies
Fort Smith Southside Mavericks

West
Bentonville Tigers
Bentonville West Wolverines
Fayetteville Purple Bulldogs
Har-Ber Wildcats
Heritage War Eagles
Rogers Mountaineers
Springdale Bulldogs
Van Buren Pointers

Class 6A
The following conferences exist within the 6A classification for the 2016–18 school years:

East
Jacksonville Titans
Jonesboro Golden Hurricanes
Little Rock Hall Warriors
Marion Patriots
Mountain Home Bombers
Pine Bluff Zebras
Searcy Lions
West Memphis Blue Devils

West
Benton Panthers
El Dorado Wildcats
Greenwood Bulldogs
Lake Hamilton Wolves
Russellville Cyclones
Sheridan Yellowjackets
Siloam Springs Panthers
(Texarkana) Arkansas Razorbacks

Class 5A
The following conferences exist within the 5A classification for the 2016–18 school years:

East
Batesville Pioneers
Blytheville Chickasaws
Forrest City Mustangs
Greene County Tech Golden Eagles
Nettleton Raiders
Paragould Rams
Valley View Blazers
Wynne Yellowjackets

West
Alma Airedales
Clarksville Panthers
Farmington Cardinals
Greenbrier Panthers
Harrison Golden Goblins
Maumelle Hornets
Morrilton Devil Dogs
Vilonia Eagles

Central
Beebe Badgers
J. A. Fair War Eagles
Little Rock Christian Warriors
McClellan Crimson Lions
Mills Comets
Little Rock Parkview Patriots
Pulaski Academy Bruins
Sylvan Hills Bears

South
Camden Fairview Cardinals
De Queen Leopards
Hope Bobcats
Hot Springs Trojans
Hot Springs Lakeside Rams
Magnolia Panthers
Watson Chapel Wildcats
White Hall Bulldogs

Class 4A
The following conferences exist within the 4A classification for the 2016–18 school years:

Region 1
Berryville Bobcats
Gentry Pioneers
Gravette Lions
Huntsville Eagles
Lincoln Wolves
Pea Ridge Blackhawks
Prairie Grove Tigers
Shiloh Christian Saints

Region 2
Arkansas Baptist Eagles
Central Arkansas Christian Mustangs
E-Stem Mets (BB)
Heber Springs Panthers
Helena-West Helena Central Cougars
Lonoke Jackrabbits
Riverview Raiders
Southside–Batesville Southerners
Stuttgart Ricebirds

Region 3
Brookland Bearcats
Cave City Cavemen
Gosnell Pirates
Harrisburg Hornets
Highland Rebels
Pocahontas Redskins
Trumann Wildcats
Jonesboro Westside Warriors

Region 4
Booneville Bearcats
Dardanelle Sand Lizards
Dover Pirates
Ozark Hillbillies
Pottsville Apaches
Subiaco Academy Trojans
Waldron Bulldogs
West Fork Tigers

Region 7
Arkadelphia Badgers
Ashdown Panthers
Bauxite Miners
Fountain Lake Cobras
Malvern Leopards
Mena Bearcats
Nashville Scrappers
Joe T. Robinson Senators

Region 8
Crossett Eagles
DeWitt Dragons
Dollarway Cardinals
Dumas Bobcats
Hamburg Lions
Monticello Billies
Star City Bulldogs
Warren Lumberjacks

Class 3A
The conference membership within the 3A Classification are adjusted for schools that do not field a football team. The following conferences exist within the 3A classification for the 2016–18 school years:

Football

Region 1
Clinton Yellowjackets
Elkins Elks
Green Forest Tigers
Greenland Pirates
Marshall Bobcats
Melbourne Bearkatz
Mountain View Yellowjackets
Yellville–Summit Panthers

Region 2
Bald Knob Bulldogs
Barton Bears
Cedar Ridge Timberwolves
Episcopal Collegiate Wildcats
Harding Academy Wildcats
Lee Trojans
Mayflower Eagles
Rose Bud Ramblers

Region 3
Corning Bobcats
Hoxie Mustangs
Manila Lions
Newport Greyhounds
Osceola Seminoles
Piggott Mohawks
Rivercrest Colts
Walnut Ridge Bobcats

Region 4
Atkins Red Devils
Cedarville Pirates
Charleston Tigers
Lamar Warriors
Mansfield Tigers
Paris Eagles
Perryville Mustangs
Two Rivers Gators

Region 5
Bismarck Lions
Centerpoint Knights
Glen Rose Beavers
Gurdon Go-Devils
Haskell Harmony Grove Cardinals
Horatio Lions
Jessieville Lions
Prescott Curley Wolves

Region 6
Drew Central Pirates
Fordyce Redbugs
Fouke Panthers
Genoa Central Dragons
Junction City Dragons
Lakeside Lake Village Beavers
McGehee Owls
Smackover Buckaroos

Basketball

Region 1 West
Cedarville Pirates
Charleston Tigers
Elkins Elks
Greenland Pirates
Haas Hall Mastiffs
Mansfield Tigers

Region 1 East
Bergman Panthers
Clinton Yellowjackets
Green Forest Tigers
Marshall Bobcats
Melbourne Bearkatz
Mountain View Tigers
Valley Springs Tigers
Yellville–Summit Panthers

Region 2
Bald Knob Bulldogs
Barton Bears
Cedar Ridge Timberwolves
Harding Academy Wildcats
KIPP: Delta Prep
Lee Trojans
Newport Greyhounds
Tuckerman Bulldogs

Region 3
Corning Bobcats
Hoxie Mustangs
Manila Lions
Osceola Seminoles
Piggott Mohawks
Rivercrest Colts
Riverside Rebels
Walnut Ridge Bobcats

Region 4
Atkins Red Devils
Jessieville Lions
Lamar Warriors
Paris Eagles
Perryville Mustangs
Two Rivers Gators

Region 5
Bismarck Lions
Episcopal Collegiate Wildcats
Glen Rose Beavers
Haskell Harmony Grove Cardinals
LISA Academy Jaguars
Mayflower Eagles
Rose Bud Ramblers

Region 7
Centerpoint Knights
Cossatot River Eagles
Fouke Panthers
Genoa Central Dragons
Gurdon Go-Devils
Horatio Lions
Prescott Curley Wolves

Region 8
Drew Central Pirates
Fordyce Redbugs
Junction City Dragons
Lakeside Lake Village Beavers
McGehee Owls
Smackover Buckaroos

Class 2A
The conference membership within the 2A Classification are adjusted for schools that do not field a football team. The following conferences exist within the 2A classification for the 2016–18 school years:

Football

Region 3
Cross County Thunderbirds
Earle Bulldogs
East Poinsett County Warriors
KIPP: Blytheville Prep
Midland Mustangs
Marked Tree Indians
Rector Cougars
Salem Greyhounds

Region 4
Danville Little Johns
Decatur Bulldogs
Hackett Hornets
J. D. Leftwich Rattlers
Lavaca Golden Arrows
Mountainburg Dragons
Western Yell County Wolverines
Johnson County Westside Rebels

Region 5
Bigelow Panthers
Conway Christian Eagles
Cutter–Morning Star Eagles
England Lions
Hector Wildcats
Magnet Cove Panthers
Poyen Indians
Quitman Bulldogs

Region 6
Augusta Red Devils
Brinkley Tigers
Carlisle Bisons
Clarendon Lions
Des Arc Eagles
Hazen Hornets
Marvell Mustangs
McCrory Jaguars
Palestine–Wheatley Patriots

Region 7
Dierks Outlaws
Foreman Gators
Lafayette County Cougars
Mineral Springs Hornets
Mount Ida Lions
Mountain Pine Red Devils
Murfreesboro Rattlers
Spring Hill Bears

Region 8
Bearden Bears
Hampton Bulldogs
Camden Harmony Grove Hornets
Hermitage Hustlin' Hermits
Parkers Chapel Trojans
Rison Wildcats
Strong Bulldogs
Woodlawn Bears

Basketball

Region 2
Buffalo Island Central Mustangs
Cotter Warriors
East Poinsett County Warriors
Flippin Bobcats
Marked Tree Indians
Marmaduke Greyhounds
Salem Greyhounds
Sloan–Hendrix Greyhounds

Region 3
Augusta Red Devils
Brinkley Tigers
Carlisle Bisons
Clarendon Lions
Cross County Thunderbirds
Des Arc Eagles
Earle Bulldogs
Hazen Hornets
McCrory Jaguars
Palestine–Wheatley Patriots

Region 4 West
Arkansas Arts Academy
Danville Little Johns
Eureka Springs Highlanders
Hackett Hornets
J. D. Leftwich Rattlers
Lavaca Golden Arrows
Mountainburg Dragons
Johnson County Westside Rebels

Region 4 East
Bigelow Panthers
Conway Christian Eagles
England Lions
Hector Wildcats
Jacksonville Lighthouse School
Pangburn Tigers
Quitman Bulldogs
St. Joseph Bulldogs
White County Central Bears

7 West
Blevins Hornets
Caddo Hills Indians
Cutter–Morning Star Eagles
Foreman Gators
Magnet Cove Panthers
Mountain Pine Red Devils
Murfreesboro Rattlers
Poyen Indians

7 East
Bearden Bears
Camden Harmony Grove Hornets
Lafayette County Cougars
Parkers Chapel Trojans
Rison Wildcats
Spring Hill Bears

Class 1A
The following conferences exist within the 1A classification for the 2016–18 school years:

1 West
County Line Indians
Hartford Hustlers
Mulberry Yellowjackets
Oark Hornets
Scranton Rockets
St. Paul Saints
Western Yell County Wolverines

1 Northwest
Alpena Leopards
Decatur Bulldogs
Haas Hall: Bentonville
Kingston Yellowjackets
Lead Hill Tigers
Omaha Eagles

1 East
Bruno–Pyatt Patriots
Deer Antlers
Jasper Pirates
Mount Judea Eagles
St. Joe Wildcats
Western Grove Warriors

2 North
Calico Rock Pirates
Hillcrest Screamin' Eagles
Izard County Cougars
Mammoth Spring Bears
Norfork Panthers
Viola Longhorns

2 South
Bradford Eagles
Concord Pirates
Midland Mustangs
Rural Special Rebels
Shirley Blue Devils
South Side Bee Branch Hornets
Timbo Tigers
Greers Ferry West Side Eagles

3 East
Armorel Tigers
Bay Yellowjackets
Crowley's Ridge Academy Falcons
KIPP: Blytheville Prep
Maynard Tigers
Rector Cougars
Ridgefield Christian Warriors

5 North
Abundant Life Owls
Academics Plus Falcons
Avilla Christian Academy
Guy–Perkins Thunderbirds
LISA Academy North Jaguars
Marvell Mustangs
Mount Vernon–Enola Warhawks
Nemo Vista Red Hawks
Sacred Heart Rebels
Wonderview Daredevils

7 West
Acorn Tigers
Dierks Outlaws
Kirby Trojans
Mineral Springs Hornets
Mount Ida Lions
Oden Timberwolves
Umpire Wildcats

7 East
Bradley Bears
Emerson Pirates
Nevada Blue Jays
Ouachita Warriors
Taylor Tigers

8 East
Dermott Rams
Hampton Bulldogs
Hermitage Hustlin' Hermits
Sparkman Raiders
Strong Bulldogs
Woodlawn Bears

State championships

Academic competitions 
The state's Quiz Bowl competitions are organized by the Arkansas Governor's Quiz Bowl Association (AGQBA) as sanctioned by the AAA.

List of Arkansas state high school quiz bowl champions 
Each spring, the Arkansas Governor's Quiz Bowl Association holds the state tournament finals for each classification.  These matches are broadcast on the Arkansas Educational Television Network (AETN).

7A classification 

(Prior to 2006-2007 school year Arkansas had only five classification divisions.)

6A classification 

(Prior to 2006-2007 school year Arkansas had only five classification divisions.)

5A classification

4A classification

3A classification

2A classification

1A classification

Fall sports

List of Arkansas state high school football champions 

To decide a winner of each classification, each conference sends the top 4 teams within them to attend the state playoffs. All number 1 seed schools get a first round bye. The playoffs are in a single elimination tournament that decides the best teams in a classification. Rounds are played weekly until two teams remain in the tournament. The two remaining teams will play at a set location to decide the state champion in the classification. These rules for playoffs apply to football only.

List of Arkansas state high school volleyball champions 
* 2021 – Fayetteville (6), Little Rock Christian, Valley View (16), Paris (5), Mansfield (6)
 2020 – Fayetteville (5), Greenwood (3), Valley View (15), Hackett (2), Mansfield (5)
 2019 – Bentonville (6), Jonesboro (14), Valley View (14), Episcopal Collegiate, Hackett
 2018 – Conway (2), Jonesboro (13), Valley View (13), Paris (4), Crowley’s Ridge (7)
 2017 – Fayetteville (4), Greenwood (2), Valley View (12), Shiloh Christian (2), Paris (3)
 2016 – Fayetteville (3), Jonesboro (12), Valley View (11), Brookland (3), Paris (2)
 2015 – Fayetteville (2), Marion (3), Valley View (10), Shiloh Christian, Paris 
 2014 – Bentonville (5), Russellville (4), Paragould (2) Mena, Mansfield (4)
 2013 – FS Southside (8), Jonesboro (11), Paragould, Valley View (9), Mansfield (3)
 2012 – Fayetteville, Russellville (3), Nettleton (3), Valley View (8), Mansfield (2)
 2011 – Bentonville (4), Marion (2), Greenwood, Valley View (7), Harding Academy
 2010 – Bentonville (3), Marion, Nettleton (2), Valley View (6), Crowley's Ridge Academy (6)
 2009 – FS Southside (7), Benton, Siloam Springs (7), Jonesboro Westside (6), Mansfield
 2008 – Bentonville (2), Jonesboro (10), Siloam Springs (6), Valley View (5), Lavaca
 2007 – Bentonville, Lake Hamilton, Siloam Springs (5), Jonesboro Westside (5), Brookland (2)
 2006 – FS Southside (6), Jonesboro (9), Siloam Springs (4), Valley View (4), Brookline
 2005 – Russellville (7), Siloam Springs (3), Valley View (3)
 2004 – FS Southside (5), Siloam Springs (2), Valley View (2)
 2003 – FS Southside (4), Morrilton (2), Valley View
 2002 – Jonesboro (8), Morrilton, Crowley's Ridge (5)
 2001 – Jonesboro (7), Siloam Springs, Jonesboro Westside (4)
 2000 – FS Southside (3), Harrison, Crowley's Ridge (4)
 1999 – FS Southside (2), Crowley's Ridge (3)
 1998 – Conway, Crowley's Ridge (2)
 1997 – FS Southside, Crowley's Ridge 
 1996 – Jonesboro (6), Harrisburg (4)
 1995 – Jonesboro (5), Harrisburg (3)
 1994 – Jonesboro (4), Jonesboro Westside (3)
 1993 – Mount St. Mary (2), Harrisburg (2)
 1992 – Jonesboro (3), Jonesboro Westside (2)
 1991 – North Little Rock, Harrisburg 
 1990 – Cabot (2), Arkadelphia (7)
 1989 – Cabot, Arkadelphia (6)
 1988 – Mount St. Mary, Arkadelphia (5)
 1987 – Jonesboro (2), Nettleton
 1986 – LR Central, Arkadelphia (4)
 1985 – Texarkana, Arkadelphia (3)
 1984 – West Helena Central (4), Arkadelphia (2)
 1983 – West Helena Central (3), Jonesboro Westside
 1982 – Russellville (2), Arkadelphia
 1981 – Russellville, Morrilton
 1980 – West Helena Central (2), Magnolia (2)
 1979 – Jonesboro, Magnolia
 1978 – West Helena Central, Ashdown
 1977 – Sylvan Hills, Mountain Home (2)
 1976 – Mountain Home

List of Arkansas state high school girls cross country champions 
The following is a (fall sport) list of Arkansas state champions in girls cross country:

 2016 – Bentonville, Siloam Springs, Little Rock Christian, Heber Springs, Genoa Central, Quitman
 2015 – Bentonville, Siloam Springs, Little Rock Christian, Pottsville, Genoa Central, Trinity Christian
 2014 – Bentonville, Siloam Springs, Little Rock Christian, Ozark, Genoa Central, Trinity Christian
 2013 – Fayetteville, Lake Hamilton, Little Rock Christian, Heber Springs, Genoa Central, Acorn
 2012 – Rogers Heritage, Lake Hamilton, Little Rock Christian, Heber Springs, Melbourne, Acorn
 2011 – Rogers, Lake Hamilton, Siloam Springs, De Queen, Harding Academy, Acorn
 2010 – Rogers, Van Buren, Batesville, De Queen, Rose Bud, Acorn 
 2009 – Bentonville, Mountain Home, Batesville, Shiloh Christian, Elkins, Trinity Christian
 2008 – Bentonville, Mountain Home, Batesville, De Queen, Elkins, Des Arc
 2007 – Rogers, Mountain Home, Batesville, Heber Springs, Green Forest, Des Arc
 2006 – Bentonville, Lake Hamilton, Batesville, Heber Springs, Genoa Central, West Side GF
 2005 – Rogers, Batesville, Heber Springs, Genoa Central
 2004 – Bentonville, Batesville, Heber Springs, Harding Academy 
 2003 – Rogers, Harrison, De Queen, LR Lutheran
 2002 – Bryant, Siloam Springs, Berryville, Harding Academy 
 2001 – Fayetteville, Siloam Springs, Berryville, Harding Academy 
 2000 – Bentonville, Harrison, Berryville, Harding Academy
 1999 – Bentonville, Harrison, Berryville, Decatur
 1998 – Bentonville, Harrison, Berryville, Shiloh Christian
 1997 – Bentonville, Harrison, Berryville, Shiloh Christian 
 1996 – Fayetteville, Harrison, Eureka Springs, DeValls Bluff 
 1995 – Bryant, Harrison, Shiloh Christian
 1994 – FS Southside, Harrison, Shiloh Christian
 1993 – Rogers, Harrison, Glenwood
 1992 – Rogers, Vilonia, Eureka Springs
 1991 – Rogers, Vilonia, Eureka Springs
 1990 – Rogers, Lake Hamilton, Eureka Springs
 1989 – Rogers, Batesville, Eureka Springs
 1988 – Fayetteville, Batesville, Caddo Hills
 1987 – Rogers, Lake Hamilton, Altus-Denning
 1986 – Conway, Lake Hamilton, Lamar
 1985 – Rogers, Lake Hamilton, Lamar
 1984 – Rogers, Vilonia, DeValls Bluff
 1983 – Rogers, Batesville, Gentry
 1982 – Rogers, Vilonia, Bradford
 1981 – Rogers, Bradford
 1980 – Rogers, Berryville

List of Arkansas state high school boys cross country champions 
The following is a (fall sport) list of Arkansas state champions in boys cross country:

 2016 – Rogers, Lake Hamilton, Maumelle, Heber Springs, Green Forest, Acorn
 2015 – Fayetteville, Lake Hamilton, Harrison, Heber Springs, Green Forest, West Side 
 2014 – Rogers, Lake Hamilton, Maumelle, Heber Springs, Green Forest, West Side 
 2013 – Rogers, Lake Hamilton, Harrison, Maumelle, Elkins, Eureka Springs
 2012 – Bentonville, Mountain Home, LR Christian, Heber Springs, Elkins, Caddo Hills 
 2011 – Bentonville, Mountain Home, LR Christian, De Queen, Elkins, Caddo Hills
 2010 – Bentonville, Russellville, LR Christian, Heber Springs, Elkins, Caddo Hills
 2009 – Bentonville, Lake Hamilton, Siloam Springs, Shiloh Christian, Elkins, Crowley's Ridge
 2008 – Rogers, Lake Hamilton, Siloam Springs, Heber Springs, Elkins, Trinity Christian
 2007 – Rogers, Lake Hamilton, Harrison, De Queen, Shiloh Christian, Jasper 
 2006 – Rogers, Lake Hamilton, Siloam Springs, Heber Springs, Genoa Central, Jasper
 2005 – Rogers, Beebe, Berryville, Jasper
 2004 – Rogers, Greene County Tech, Heber Springs, Jasper
 2003 – Rogers, Siloam Springs, De Queen, LR Lutheran
 2002 – Rogers,  Vilonia, De Queen, LR Lutheran
 2001 – Russellville, LR Fair, Berryville, Acorn
 2000 – Mountain Home, Siloam Springs, Berryville, Acorn 
 1999 – Rogers, Siloam Springs, Berryville, Eureka Springs 
 1998 – Rogers, Siloam Springs, Berryville, Acorn
 1997 – Russellville, Siloam Springs, Berryville, Acorn 
 1996 – Rogers, Crossett, Berryville, Pottsville
 1995 – Rogers, Sheridan, Eureka Springs
 1994 – Rogers, Sheridan, Eureka Springs
 1993 – Rogers, Sheridan, Eureka Springs
 1992 – Bryant, Lake Hamilton, Eureka Springs 
 1991 – Bryant, Berryville, Eureka Springs 
 1990 – Rogers, Berryville, Eureka Springs 
 1989 – Rogers, Berryville, Eureka Springs 
 1988 – Rogers, Berryville, Eureka Springs 
 1987 – Conway, Crossett, Eureka Springs 
 1986 – Fayetteville, Crossett, Eureka Springs
 1985 – Fayetteville, Harrison, Pea Ridge
 1984 – Fayetteville, Crossett, Gentry
 1983 – Fayetteville, Crossett, Central Arkansas Christian
 1982 – LR Central, Bentonville, Gentry
 1981 – LR Central, Berryville
 1980 – LR Parkview, Ozark
 1979 – LR Central, Ozark
 1978 – Cabot, Ozark
 1977 – LR Central, Berryville
 1976 – LR Central, Berryville
 1975 – LR Central, Fayetteville, Monticello, Berryville, Harding Academy 
 1974 – LR Hall, Fayetteville, Cabot, Berryville, Emerson
 1973 – LR Hall, Fayetteville, Batesville, Berryville, Emerson
 1972 – LR Central, Fayetteville, Searcy, Berryville, Emerson
 1971 – LR Central, Fayetteville, Searcy, Berryville, Plainview
 1970 – LR Central, Fayetteville, Searcy, Ozark, Kensett
 1969 – LR Central, Fayetteville, Searcy, Beebe, Kensett
 1968 – LR Central, Searcy, Charleston, Judsonia
 1967 – LR Central, Searcy, Charleston, Prairie Grove
 1966 – LR Central, Searcy, Beebe
 1965 – Fayetteville, Conway, Charleston, Stamps
 1964 – LR Central, Conway, Beebe, Stamps
 1963 – LR Central
 1962 – LR Central
 1961 – LR Central
 1960 – LR Central
 1959 – LR Central
 1958 – North Little Rock
 1957 – LR Central
 1956 – Little Rock
 1955 – Little Rock

List of Arkansas state high school golf champions

Winter sports

List of Arkansas state high school dance champions 
The state competitive dance championships are held annually in November or December.

List of Arkansas state high school cheer champions 
The state competitive cheer championships are held annually in November or December.

List of Arkansas state high school basketball champions 
The basketball season begins each November with the state basketball championship tournament held annually in late February and March.

List of Arkansas state high school boys bowling champions 
The bowling season begins each November with the state bowling championship tournament held annually in late February.

According to the AAA Bowling Handbook, all Arkansas Activities Association rules will be followed. Rules for competition shall be those of the United States Bowling Congress (USBC) American Bowling Alliance. Arkansas Activities Association rules prevail in case of a conflict with standard USBC rules.

List of Arkansas state high school girls bowling champions 
According to the AAA Bowling Handbook, all Arkansas Activities Association rules will be followed. Rules for competition shall be those of the United States Bowling Congress (USBC) American Bowling Alliance. Arkansas Activities Association rules prevail in case of a conflict with standard USBC rules.

List of Arkansas state high school wrestling champions 
Arkansas became the 49th state to add high school wrestling when the Arkansas Activities Association approved wrestling as a sanctioned sport for the 2008–09 season. The wrestling season begins each November with the state wrestling championship tournament held annually in late February. The state tournament combines wrestlers from the 7A and 6A classifications and a separate competition for the 1A through 5A classifications.

List of Arkansas state high school swimming and diving champions

Spring sports

List of Arkansas state high school soccer champions 

Boys Soccer:
2019 - Springdale (3), Russellville (5), Valley View (2), Central Arkansas Christian (3)
2018 - FS Northside (2), Russellville (4), Lakeside Hot Springs, Warren
2017 - Rogers, Siloam Springs (4), Hot Springs (2), Dardanelle (2)
2016 - Bentonville (4), Siloam Springs (3), Hot Springs, Dardanelle
2015 - Bentonville (3), Russellville (3), De Queen (6), Central Arkansas Christian (2)
2014 - Bentonville (2), Russellville (2), De Queen (5), Green Forrest
2013 - FS Northside, Searcy (6), Little Rock Christian (3), Valley View
2012 – Springdale (2), Russellville, Siloam Springs (2), De Queen (4)
2011 – LR Catholic (5), Searcy (5), Siloam Springs, De Queen (3)
2010 – LR Catholic (4), Searcy (4), Little Rock Christian (2), De Queen (2)
2009 – LR Catholic (3), Searcy (3), Little Rock Christian, De Queen
2008 – Conway, Searcy (2), Harrison (6), Central Arkansas Christian
2007 – LR Catholic (2), Searcy, Pulaski Academy (3), Clarksville
2006 – Van Buren, Harrison (5)
2005 – Bentonville, Harrison (4)
2004 – Conway, Harrison (3)
2003 – Springdale, Harrison (2)
2002 – LR Catholic, Harrison
2001 – Pulaski Academy (2)
2000 – Pulaski Academy
1999 – Fayetteville
1998 – North Little Rock

Girls Soccer:
2019 - Bryant (2), Little Rock Christian (5), Harrison (7), Central Arkansas Christian (9)
2018 - Rogers (4), Siloam Springs (5), Little Rock Christian (4), Central Arkansas Christian (8)
2017 - Bentonville (8), Siloam Springs (4), Harrison (6), Central Arkansas Christian (7)
2016 - Bentonville (7), Siloam Springs (3), Harrison (5), Central Arkansas Christian (6)
2015 – Bryant, Siloam Springs (2), Little Rock Christian (3), Gentry
2014 – Bentonville (6), Siloam Springs, Harrison (4), Valley View
2013 – Bentonville (5), Searcy (4), Shiloh Christian, Central Arkansas Christian (5)
2012 – Bentonville (4), Russellville, Central Arkansas Christian (4), Pulaski Academy (6)
2011 – Conway, Mountain Home (2), Harrison (3), Pulaski Academy (5)
2010 – Bentonville (3), Searcy (3), Little Rock Christian (2), Conway St. Joseph (2)
2009 – Bentonville (2), Mountain Home, Little Rock Christian, Conway St. Joseph
2008 – Mount St. Mary, Searcy (2), Pulaski Academy (4), Central Arkansas Christian (3)
2007 – Bentonville, Searcy, Pulaski Academy (3), Central Arkansas Christian (2)
2006 – Rogers (3), Central Arkansas Christian
2005 – Rogers (2), Pulaski Academy (2)
2004 – Rogers, Harrison (2)
2003 – LR Central (2), Pulaski Academy
2002 – LR Central, Harrison
2001 - Fayetteville (4)
2000 – Fayetteville (3)
1999 – Fayetteville (2)
1998 – Fayetteville

List of Arkansas state high school baseball champions

List of Arkansas state high school softball champions 

 Fast Pitch
 2017 – Bentonville (2), Sheridan (3), De Queen, Pottsville, Rose Bud, Rison, Taylor (4)
 2016 – Bentonville, Sheridan (2), Vilonia (3), Mena (2), Bald Knob (3), Spring Hill (2), Nemo Vista (3)
 2015 – North Little Rock (7), Greenwood, Vilonia (2), Mena, Bald Knob (2), Spring Hill, Scranton (2)
 2014 – North Little Rock (6), Benton (3), White Hall (3), Brookland, Bald Knob, Foreman (7), Midland 
 2013 – North Little Rock (5), Russelville, White Hall (2), Nashville (3), Benton Harmony Grove (4), Magnet Cove, Taylor (3)
 2012 – Bryant (6), Lake Hamilton (4), White Hall, Nashville (2), Mansfield, Junction City, Taylor (2)
 2011 – Bryant (5), Searcy, Wynne, Farmington, Atkins, Foreman (6), Nemo Vista (2)
 2010 – Bryant (4), Mountain Home, Greenbrier, Nashville, Arkansas Baptist (4), Foreman (5), Armorel
 2009 – North Little Rock (4), Lake Hamilton (3), Wynne, Dardanelle, Perryville, Foreman (4), Scranton
 2008 – North Little Rock (3), Mountain Home, Nettleton, Ashdown, Elkins, Foreman (3), Nemo Vista
 2007 – Fayetteville, Lake Hamilton (2), Vilonia, Dardanelle, Elkins, Foreman (2), West Side GF
 2006 – Fayetteville, Marion, Central Arkansas Christian, Foreman, Lockesburg
 2005 – Benton (2), Batesville, Farmington, Arkansas Baptist (3), Taylor
 2004 – Benton, Hope, Booneville, Benton Harmony Grove (3), Lockesburg
 2003 – Texarkana, Hope, Prairie Grove (3), Benton Harmony Grove (2), Ouachita
 2002 – North Little Rock (2), Nettleton, Prairie Grove (2), Benton Harmony Grove
 2001 – North Little Rock, Batesville, Prairie Grove, Newark
 2000 – Rogers, Lake Hamilton, Farmington
 1999 – Sheridan
 Slow Pitch
 2003 – McCrory
 2002 – Hoxie
 2001 – Parkers Chapel, Ouachita
 2000 – Sylvan Hills, Murfreesboro, Lockesburg (2)
 1999 – Bryant (3), Nashville, Cedarville, Lockesburg
 1998 – Benton, Greenwood, Southside Batesville, Arkansas Baptist (2), Guy-Perkins
 1997 – Bryant (2), Batesville, Nettleton, Arkansas Baptist
 1996 – Bryant, Vilonia, Barton, St. Joseph

List of Arkansas state high school tennis champions

List of Arkansas state high school track and field champions

See also 

 List of high schools in Arkansas
 List of school districts in Arkansas
Mississippi Association of Independent Schools
 NFHS

References

External links
 

1904 establishments in Arkansas
Activities Association, Arkansas
High school sports associations in the United States
High school sports in Arkansas
Activities Association, Arkansas
Activities Association, Arkansas
Sports leagues established in 1904